Sing While You're Able is a 1937 American musical film directed by Marshall Neilan and written by Charles R. Condon and Sherman L. Lowe. The film stars Pinky Tomlin, Toby Wing, Bert Roach, Sam Wren, Monte Collins and Suzanne Kaaren. The film was released on March 20, 1937, by Ambassador Pictures.

Plot
Father and daughter find a singing hillbilly in Arkansas, then they bring him to the big city to help with their radio ratings.

Cast          
Pinky Tomlin as Whitey Morgan
Toby Wing as Joan Williams
Bert Roach as Val Blodgett
Sam Wren as Harvey Bennett
Monte Collins as Adams
Suzanne Kaaren as Gloria
Harry C. Bradley as C. William Williams
Michael Romanoff as Prince Boris 
Fern Emmett as Landlady
Rita Carlyle as Thelma Manners
Betty Brian as Jane 
Doris Brian as Dotty 
Gwen Brian as Rita 
Lane Chandler as Simpson
James Newill as Radio Singer
Harry Strang as Chatham
Henry Roquemore as Party Host
Gladys Gale as Party Hostess
Martha Tilton as Singing Party Guest
Elma Pappas as Torch Singer

References

External links
 

1937 films
1930s English-language films
American musical films
1937 musical films
Films directed by Marshall Neilan
American black-and-white films
1930s American films
Films about hillbillies